Donna Dasko (born August 19, 1951) is a Canadian senator from Ontario. She was nominated by Justin Trudeau and appointed to the Senate on June 6, 2018.

Prior to her appointment, Dasko was a senior vice-president of the polling firm Environics, she is a fellow at the University of Toronto's School of Public Policy and Governance and teaches in the master's program.

References

External links
 

Living people
1951 births
Canadian senators from Ontario
21st-century Canadian politicians
Independent Senators Group
Pollsters
Academic staff of the University of Toronto